Aziz Mian Qawwal (17 April 1942 – 6 December 2000) was a Pakistani traditional qawwal  famous for singing ghazals in his own style of qawwali and is considered one of the greatest qawwals in South Asia. He holds the record for singing the longest commercially released qawwali, Hashr Ke Roz Yeh Poochhunga, which runs slightly over 150 minutes and. Aziz is known by sobriquets — "Shahenshah-e-Qawwali" (King of qawwali), "Fauji Qawwal"(Military Singer) since his early performances were often in army barracks, and "the Nietzschean qawwal".

Early life and background
Aziz Mian was born as Abdul Aziz (Urdu: عبد العزیز) in Delhi, British India. The exclamation Mian, which he often used in his qawwalis, became part of his stage name. He began to introduce himself as Aziz Mian Meeruthi. The word Meeruthi refers to Meerut, a city in northern India, from where he migrated to Pakistan in 1947.

At the age of ten, he began learning Harmonium under the tutelage of Ustad Abdul Wahid Khan of Lahore. He received sixteen years of training at the Data Ganj Baksh School of Lahore, and earned masters (M.A) degrees in Urdu literature, Islamic Studies and Philosophy  And Bachelor's degree in English literature   from the University of Punjab, Lahore.

Career
Aziz Mian was one of the non-traditional Pakistani Qawwals. His voice was raspy and powerful. Aziz Mian was the only prominent qawwal to write his own lyrics (though, like others, he also performed songs written by other poets). Aziz Mian was a contemporary, and often a competitor of Sabri Brothers.

He first began performing at private gatherings. However, his official ‘start' came in 1966, when he performed in front of the Shah of Iran Reza Shah Pahlavi. The Shah of Iran was so moved by his performance that he gave Aziz Mian a gold medal. From this moment on, Aziz Mian gained popularity and started releasing albums. In addition to singing qawwalis, he was also an expert at singing ghazals. He became a noted member of the qawwal community due to his unique and crisp voice. In the early days of his career, he was nicknamed Fauji Qawwal (meaning "Military Qawwal") because most of his early stage-performances were in military barracks for the army personnel. He was known for a "more recitative, more dramatic diction" and was inclined toward qawwali's religious rather than entertainment qualities, though he also enjoyed success in more ashiqana sufi qawwalis.

He was fond of discussing religious and Sufi paradoxes in his qawwalis. He directly addressed Allah and complained about the misery of man (the greatest creation of the Almighty). In addition to his own poetry, Aziz Mian performed poetry by Allama Iqbal, and a number of contemporary Urdu poets, including Allama Iqbal, Qamar Jalalvi, Jigar Moradabadi, Tabish Kanpuri S M Sadiq, Saifuddin Saif and Qateel Shifai.

Death
Aziz Mian died from complications of hepatitis in Tehran, Iran on 6 December 2000. He was in Iran at the invitation of the Government of Iran, to perform on the occasion of Imam Ali's death anniversary. He is buried in Multan, on the brink of Nau Bahar Nehar[Canal]. His death anniversary (Urs) is celebrated every year on the first Thursday of May, the Urs celebrations commence with the 'Ghusal' ceremony conducted by Mian Saheb's son Shibli Aziz and Rasm e Sandal of Baba Nadir Hussain famously known as 'Tootan Waali Sarkar' who is Peer O Murshid (Spiritual Master) of Aziz Mian. The Urs celebrations continue for three days, starting with 'Ghusal' followed by 'Chadar Poshi' and 'Mehfil e Samaa' of Qawwali ('samaa' means the listening audience in Urdu and Arabic). Around seven to eight qawwal groups perform. The celebration terminates after the last ritual of 'Qul'. The Urs (death anniversary) celebration are organized by Shibli Aziz Mian, who is more interested in mysticism and Sufi traditions. He is promoting and propagating this spiritual heritage of his father and have quite a number of disciples (mureeds) and followers.

Family
Aziz Mian had 12 children. And had nine sons Amir Khusro, Shibli, Junaid, Tabreiz, Imran, Naeem, Aslam and Farhan, etc. His son Shibli is not a qawwal but his successor in Sufism, while all other sons have followed his footsteps in Qawwali. They are very similar in style to Aziz Mian himself and like other sons of famous qawwals (Amjad Sabri for example, or Waheed and Naveed Chishti), they perform many of their father's hits. Tabrez is however considered to be the closest to his father's style. His looks and his style are a mirror image of his father. Tabrez also toured North America for a tribute to Aziz Mian Qawwal.

Legacy 
 Aziz Mian Qawwal is considered to be one of the  influential Sufi Qawwali singers of Pakistan
 His famous Qawwali Main Sharabi was featured in Indian movie Cocktail and was sung by his son Imran Aziz Mian
 A bridge was named after Aziz Mian as Aziz Mian Bridge near his shrine in Multan.

Awards and recognition
His First Tour Was Of Iran During 1966, There He Performed His First International Performance Before Shah Of Iran Mohammad Reza Pahlavi, he was awarded with a Gold Medal after the performance.
For his service in music, the Government of Pakistan awarded him the Pride of Performance medal in 1989.

Works
Aziz Mian Qawwal received a worldwide recognition and fame with his Masterworks and earned the title of One of the Greatest Qawwals, Some of his works include – 
 
 Teri Soorat Nigahon Mein Phirti Rahe / Main Sharabi Main Sharabi
(Lyrics by – Tabish Kanpuri & Aziz Mian)
 
 Allah Hi Jaane Kaun Bashar Hai
(Lyrics by – Aziz Mian)
 
 Nabi Nabi Ya Nabi Nabi 
(Lyrics by – Aziz Mian)
 
 Aadmi Hai Benazir
(Lyrics by – Abdul Hamid Alam)
 
 Meri Daastan E Hasrat
(Lyrics by – Saifuddin Saif)
 
 Naseem E Subha Gulshan Mein
(Lyrics by – Allama Simab Akbarabadi & Aziz Mian)
 
 Bewafa Yun Tera Muskurana Bhool Jaane Ke Qaabil Nahi Hai
(Lyrics by – Tabish Kanpuri & Aziz Mian)
 
 Haaye Kambakht Tu Ne Pi Hi Nahi
(Lyrics by – Aziz Mian)
 
 Unki Aakhon Se Masti Barasti Rahe
(Lyrics by – Abdul Hamid Alam & Aziz Mian)
 
 Aasman Se Utaara Gaya
(Lyrics by – Nazeer Banarasi & Aziz Mian)
 
 Kabhi Kaha Na Kisi Se / Daba Ke Chal Diye
(Lyrics by – Ustaad Qamar Jalalvi & Aziz Mian)
 
 Mere Khoon E Arzoo / Ye Maqam E Zindagani
(Lyrics by – Purnam Allahbadi & Aziz Mian)
 
 Woh Dil Hi Kya Tere Milne Ki Jo Dua Na Kare
(Lyrics by – Qateel Shifai & Aziz Mian)
 
 Main Kya Janu Ram Tera Gorakh Dhandha
(Lyrics by – Kabir Das, Allama Iqbal, & Aziz Mian)
 
 Jannat Mujhe Mile Na Mile 
(Lyrics by – Aziz Mian)
 
 Hashr Ke Roz Main Poochoonga
(Lyrics by – Aziz Mian)
 
 Meri Arzoo Muhammad / Na Kaleem Ka Tassawur

Albums
 1976 Aziz Mian  (EMI Pakistan)
 1976 Allah Hi Jaane Kaun Bashar Hai (EMI Pakistan)
 1977 Aziz Mian Qawwal & Party (EMI Pakistan)
 1978 Baksh Deta Toh Baat Kuch Bhi Na Thi (EMI Pakistan)
 1978 Is Tere Sar Ki Qasam (EMI Pakistan)
 1978 Voh Dil Hi Kya Tere Milne Ki Jo Dua Na Kare (EMI Pakistan)
 1979 Aziz Mian & Others – Teri Soorat Nigahon Mei Phirti Rahe / Main Sharabi (EMI Pakistan)
 1979 Ashk Aankho Mei Thamte Nahi Hai (Emi Pakistan)
 1979 Ik Mard E Qalandar (Shalimar Recording Company Pakistan / Multitone Records)
 1980 Nabi Nabi Ya Nabi Nabi (EMI Pakistan)
 1980 Ye Mai Hai Zara Sonch (EMI Pakistan)
 1980 Aaj Ki Raat Hai (EMI Pakistan)
 1980 Aziz Mian Qawwal (EMI Pakistan)
 1980 Tarrapte Hai Machalte Hai (Shalimar Recording Company Pakistan / Multitone Records)
 1981 Aziz Mian Ka Wada (EMI Pakistan)
 1981 Aziz Mian Vol.1 (EMI Pakistan)
 1981 Aziz Mian Vol.2 (EMI Pakistan)
 1982 Aankh Barsi Hai Tere Naam Pe (EMI Pakistan)
 1982 Tha Bhi Mai Aur Hoo Bhi Mai (EMI Pakistan)
 1983 Yeh Paisa Kya Karega (EMI Pakistan)
 1983 Mitti Ki Moorat (EMI Pakistan)
 1983 Shahbaz Qalandar (EMI Pakistan)
 1983 Soey Maikada Na Jaate (EMI Pakistan)
 1984 Hashr Ke Roz Volume – 1 & 2 (EMI Pakistan)
 1984 Jannat Mujhe Mile Na Mile (EMI Pakistan)
 1984 Ae Ri Mai Toh Prem Deewani (EMI Pakistan)
 1985 Aasman Se Utaara Gaya (EMI Pakistan)
 1985 Jalwo Se Muhammad (S) Ke (EMI Pakistan)
 1986 Rag Rag Bole Rasool (S) Meri (EMI Pakistan)
 1986 Bhala Hua Kabeera (EMI Pakistan)
 1990 Is Daur Ke Insaan Se Kuch Bhool Hui Hai (EMI Pakistan)
 1990 Greatest Hits Of Aziz Mian (EMI Pakistan)
 1992 Milegi Shaikh Ko Jannat (OSA Records)
 1993 Sharabee Sharabee Teri Soorat (OSA Records)
 1993 Sharabee Live in England (OSA Records)
 1994 Qalandar Mast Qalandar Vol.5 (OSA Records)
 1994 Takhti Vol.30 (OSA Records)
 1994 Taj Dar E Haram Vol.32 (OSA Records)
 1994 Shaam Pae Gayee (OSA Records) 
 1995 Wadah (OSA Records)
 1995 Saaya E Mustafa Hussain (OSA Records)
 1995 Sajdah (OSA Records)
 1995 Rut Albeli Raat Suhani Vol.4 (OSA Records)
 1995 Naseem E Subha (OSA Records)
 1995 Dhoom (OSA Records)
 1995 Allah Hi Jaane Vol.14 (OSA Records)
 1996 Mere Khoon E Arzoo Ko (Sonic Enterprises)
 1996 Khwaja Piya (OSA Records)
 1996 Khwaja Ki Deewani (OSA Records)
 1996 Ishq Mei Ham (OSA Records)
 1996 Dil Jala (OSA Records)
 1996 Bhar Do Jholi (OSA Records)
 1996 Bewafa Vol.15 (OSA Records)
 1997 Jannat Mujhe Mile (OSA Records)
 1997 Allah Hi Jane Live in England (OSA Records)
 1997 Akhian Dee Gali (OSA records)
 1997 Jaisi Karni Waisi Bharni (MovieBox UK) 
 1997 Allah Bahot Bada Hai (Moviebox Birmingham)
 1998 Shikwa Jawab E Shikwa (OSA Records)
 1999 Maati Ke Putle(OSA Records)
 1999 Chaadar Fatima Ki (OSA Records)
 1999 Humen Toh Loot Liya (Hi-Tech Music) 
 1999 Bade Badnaseeb Theh Hum (Hi-Tech Music)
 2003 Nas Nas Bole Nabi Nabi (S) (OSA Records)
 2003 Duniya Ka Ajeeb Bazaar – Last Recording (OSA Records)
 2007 Mere Saamne Reh (OSA Records)
 2014 Hum Kaise Guzaara Karte Hai (EMI Pakistan)
Contributing artist
 1987 Sher E Yazdaan Ali Ali (EMI Pakistan)
 1987 Maikhana – Aziz Miyan & Sabri Brothers (EMI Pakistan)
 2004 Main Sharabi – Aziz Mian & Sabri Brothers Qawwal (OSA Records)
 2006 The Best Qawwali Album in the World Ever – Nusrat Fateh Ali Khan, The Sabri Brothers & Aziz Mian (EMI Pakistan)

References

External links

1942 births
2000 deaths
Muhajir people
Pakistani qawwali singers
20th-century Pakistani male singers
Recipients of the Pride of Performance
University of the Punjab alumni
Singers from Lahore
Singers from Delhi
People from Meerut